FK Dračevo is a Macedonian football club based in the town Dračevo in Skopje, North Macedonia.

History
The club was founded in 2003, they are recently competed in the Macedonian Third League.

References

External links
Club info at MacedonianFootball 
Macedonian Football Federation 

Football clubs in Skopje
Association football clubs established in 2003
2003 establishments in the Republic of Macedonia